Svetlana Aleksandrovna Demina (born April 18, 1961 in Vologda Oblast) is a Russian sport shooter, specializing in the skeet shootings event. She won the silver medal at the 2000 Olympic Games in the skeet event. She has competed at five Olympic Games: 1988, 1996, 2000, 2004 and 2008 .

Olympic results

External links
Profile on issfnews.com

1961 births
Living people
Sportspeople from Vologda Oblast
Soviet female sport shooters
Russian female sport shooters
Skeet shooters
Trap and double trap shooters
Olympic shooters of the Soviet Union
Olympic shooters of Russia
Shooters at the 1988 Summer Olympics
Shooters at the 1996 Summer Olympics
Shooters at the 2000 Summer Olympics
Shooters at the 2004 Summer Olympics
Shooters at the 2008 Summer Olympics
Olympic silver medalists for Russia
Olympic medalists in shooting
Medalists at the 2000 Summer Olympics